Tollywood Squares is the official Telugu version of Hollywood Squares. This is the first time internationally successful Hollywood Squares format was adapted in an Indian language. It was produced by VIU for Telecast on the Star Maa Telugu Channel, and it is also available on Viu digital platform.

The first season (26 Episodes) was hosted by the Telugu actor/host Navdeep and was directed by Hemant Apte.

References 

Indian game shows
Telugu-language television shows
Hollywood Squares
Star Maa original programming